Sigurd Lybeck (25 September 1895 – 5 November 1975) was a Norwegian  writer. He is most commonly associated with his writing featuring the popular literary figure, Jens von Bustenskjold.

Biography
Lybeck was born in the parish of  Etnedal   in Oppland, Norway.  He was the youngest of four brothers raised on the Lybekk farm.  He received training  in Kristiania (nor Oslo) and was employed as a forest worker.

He also wrote several popular novels and stories, mostly published as feuilletons in newspapers and magazines. He wrote in a popular humorous sequel style. His breakthrough was the series De giftegalne kaller i Oladalen, published in Arbeidermagasinet in 1928. He is particularly remembered as the creator of the fictional character Jens von Bustenskjold from the rural valley of Oladalen. Lybeck was the author of the series which was illustrated by Anders Bjørgaard (1891-1967) and appeared in Arbeidermagasinet  from 1935.  Bustenskjold also was the main character in a comic book series published between 1934-1970.  The 1958 comedy film Bustenskjold by director Helge Lunde (1900-1987) was based on this series and had comic actor  Leif Juster (1910-1995)  playing the title character.

Selected works
Ragnhild Skaalien. Et sagn fra Valdres, 1922
    Rydningsmand, 1924
    Folk nord i grenda, 1944
    På villstrå, 1945
    Trollhegg, 1946
    Den ensomme striden. Fortelling fra en fjellbygd, 1947
    Marte fra Hulderhaugen, 1950
    Matja. Fortellingen om en mor, 1967
    Tore Navarhaugens store kjærlighet. 1989 
    Gull-Dora og de to knarkene i Åsbygda, 1992

References

Other sources
Lybeck, Torodd  (1995) Minneskrift for Sigurd Lybeck: 1895-1995
Haganæs, Jul  (1989)  En folkets forteller : Sigurd Lybeck, etnedølen som skapte Bustenskjold (Oslo: Grøndahl og Dreyer) 

1895 births
1975 deaths
People from Etnedal
Norwegian comics writers
20th-century Norwegian novelists